The second 2008 edition of the UNAF U-17 Tournament took place in December 2008, with Algeria as the host of the tournament.

Participants

 (invited)

Tournament

Champions

References

2008 in African football
2008
2008
2008–09 in Algerian football
2008–09 in Tunisian football
2008–09 in Libyan football
2008–09 in Moroccan football